The Southern Railway (SR) gave the designation 2-HAL to the electric multiple units built during the late 1930s to work long-distance semi-fast services on the newly electrified lines from London Victoria to Maidstone and Gillingham (Kent). This type of unit survived long enough in British Rail ownership to be allocated TOPS Class 402.

Construction
A development of the earlier 2-BIL units, the 2-HAL units (2-car Half Lavatory stock) were so-called because only one car in each unit had a lavatory. They were built in three batches:

The handful of post-war units were of completely different appearance, of all-steel construction, and looked very like the standard 4-SUB units being built at the same time, with flat ends, whereas the main 2-HAL units had the domed end appearance of the first 10 prototype "Queen Mary" 4-SUB units.

In the early 1960s the Eastern Division was fully changed over to EP-braked electric stock, and the 2-HAL units operating from Victoria to Maidstone/Gillingham etc. were removed to the Central and Western Divisions, being replaced by the large new build of 2-HAP units. The units then remained in service on these divisions until replaced at the end of their life by new 4-VEP units.

Formations
The original formations of these units are set out in the table below:

Departmental service

De-icing units
In 1967, three units were converted for de-icing the 3rd rail and were renumbered 001 - 003. These units operated from depots at Eastleigh and Bournemouth.

Stores units
In 1970, two units were converted for use transporting stores between depots. Renumbered 022 and 023 these units linked Eastleigh Works and other depots on the Southern Region and followed a set route on a weekly schedule. Unit 022 was allocated to Slade Green and served Stewarts Lane, Hither Green, Ashford, Ramsgate and Slade Green while Unit 023 was allocated to Brighton and served Wimbledon, Selhurst, New Cross Gate, Brighton and Fratton.

2-PAN
In 1971, six units were converted for use conveying parcels and newspaper traffic. They were renumbered 061-066 and designated 2-PAN (2-car Parcels and Newspapers stock), reusing the PAN code originally allocated to 6-PAN (Pantry) stock. Their life was not extended by long; within two years, all had been withdrawn.

Withdrawal
After withdrawal in 1971, various 2-HAL units in company with 2-BIL units were noted at Stratford in east London destined for scrapping by Kings of Norwich, or being hauled west for scrapping in the Newport area.

References

Citations

Sources

2HAL
402
Train-related introductions in 1939
750 V DC multiple units